SFL Bremerhaven is a German football club based in Bremerhaven, Bremen. It was founded in 1975 and plays in the Bremen-Liga, fifth tier on German football.

Current squad

References 
 

Association football clubs established in 1975
1975 establishments in West Germany
Football clubs in Bremen (state)
Bremerhaven, SFL
Sport in Bremerhaven